The 2013 Colorado Rockies season was the franchise's 21st in Major League Baseball. The season marked the Rockies' 18th season of playing their home games at Coors Field.  It was Todd Helton's 17th and final season with the Rockies and Walt Weiss' first season as manager.

Offseason
November 20, 2012: Matt Reynolds was traded by the Colorado Rockies to the Arizona Diamondbacks for Ryan Wheeler.
December 4, 2012: Alex White was traded by the Colorado Rockies with Alex Gillingham (minors) to the Houston Astros for Wilton López and a player to be named later.  The Houston Astros sent Jose Monzon (minors) (May 1, 2013) to the Colorado Rockies to complete the trade.
January 24, 2013: Yorvit Torrealba was signed as a free agent by the Colorado Rockies.
March 24, 2013: Jon Garland was signed a free agent by the Colorado Rockies.

Regular season

Season standings

National League West

National League Wild Card

Record vs. opponents

Transactions
May 1, 2013: Chris Nelson was traded by the Colorado Rockies to the New York Yankees for a player to be named later.  The New York Yankees sent Yoely Bello (minors) (September 11, 2013) to the Colorado Rockies to complete the trade.
May 2, 2013: Roy Oswalt was signed as a free agent by the Colorado Rockies.
June 10, 2013: Jon Garland was released by the Colorado Rockies.
June 18, 2013: Eric Young, Jr. was traded by the Colorado Rockies to the New York Mets for Collin McHugh.
July 9, 2013: Mitchell Boggs was purchased by the Colorado Rockies from the St. Louis Cardinals.

Major League Debuts
Batters
Nolan Arenado (Apr 28)
Corey Dickerson (Jun 22)
Pitchers
Chad Bettis (Aug 1)

Roster

Game log 

|-  bgcolor="ffbbbb"
|- align="center" bgcolor="ffbbbb"
| 1 || April 1 || @ Brewers || 5–4 (10) || Henderson (1–0) || Ottavino (0–1) || || 45,781 || 0–1
|- align="center" bgcolor="bbffbb"
| 2 || April 2 || @ Brewers || 8–4 || Escalona (1–0) || Gonzalez (0–1) || Betancourt (1) || 24,753 || 1–1
|- align="center" bgcolor="bbffbb"
| 3 || April 3 || @ Brewers || 7–3 || Nicasio (1–0) || Peralta (0–1) || || 25,766 || 2–1
|- align="center" bgcolor="bbffbb"
| 4 || April 5 || Padres || 5–2 || Francis (1–0) || Marquis (0–1) || Betancourt (2) || 49,077 || 3–1
|- align="center" bgcolor="bbffbb"
| 5 || April 6 || Padres || 6–3 || Garland (1–0) || Ross (0–1) || Betancourt (3) || 31,133 || 4–1
|- align="center" bgcolor="bbffbb"
| 6 || April 7 || Padres || 9–1 || Chacín (1–0) || Vólquez (0–2) || || 31,060 || 5–1
|- align="center" bgcolor="ffbbbb"
| 7 || April 8 || @ Giants || 4–2 || Bumgarner (2–0) || de la Rosa (0–1) || Romo (4) || 41,133 || 5–2
|- align="center" bgcolor="ffbbbb"
| 8 || April 9 || @ Giants || 9–6 || Casilla (1–0) || Belisle (0–1) || Romo (5) || 41,910 || 5–3
|- align="center" bgcolor="ffbbbb"
| 9 || April 10 || @ Giants || 10–0 || Zito (2–0) || Francis (1–1) || || 41,606 || 5–4
|- align="center" bgcolor="bbffbb"
| 10 || April 12 || @ Padres || 7–5 || Brothers (1–0) || Street (0–1) || Betancourt (4) || 21,814 || 6–4
|- align="center" bgcolor="bbffbb"
| 11 || April 13 || @ Padres || 9–5 || Chacín (2–0) || Vólquez (0–3) || || 29,523 || 7–4
|- align="center" bgcolor="bbffbb"
| 12 || April 14 || @ Padres || 2–1 || de la Rosa (1–1) || Thayer (0–1) || Betancourt (5) || 21,337 || 8–4
|- align="center" bgcolor="bbbbbb"
| – || April 15 || Mets || colspan=6 | Postponed (snow) Rescheduled for April 16
|- align="center" bgcolor="bbffbb"
| 13 || April 16 || Mets || 8–4 || Nicasio (2–0) || Gee (0–3) || || 21,510 || 9–4
|- align="center" bgcolor="bbffbb"
| 14 || April 16 || Mets || 9–8 (10) || Betancourt (1–0) || Burke (0–1) || || 20,239 || 10–4
|- align="center" bgcolor="bbbbbb"
| – || April 17 || Mets || colspan=6 | Postponed (snow) Rescheduled for June 27
|- align="center" bgcolor="bbffbb"
| 15 || April 18 || Mets || 11–3 || Garland (2–0) || Niese (2–1) || || 18,341 || 11–4
|- align="center" bgcolor="bbffbb"
| 16 || April 19 || Diamondbacks || 3–1 || Chacín (3–0) || Kennedy (1–2) || Betancourt (6) || 23,445 || 12–4
|- align="center" bgcolor="bbffbb"
| 17 || April 20 || Diamondbacks || 4–3 || de la Rosa (2–1) || Cahill (0–3) || Betancourt (7) || 30,380 || 13–4
|- align="center" bgcolor="ffbbbb"
| 18 || April 21 || Diamondbacks || 5–4 || Bell (2–0) || López (0–1) || Putz (3) || 42,507 || 13–5
|- align="center" bgcolor="bbbbbb"
| – || April 22 || Braves || colspan=6 | Postponed (snow) Rescheduled for April 23
|- align="center" bgcolor="ffbbbb"
| 19 || April 23 || Braves || 4–3 || Minor (3–1) || Francis (1–2) || Kimbrel (8) || 19,124 || 13–6
|- align="center" bgcolor="ffbbbb"
| 20 || April 23 || Braves || 10–2 || Teherán (1–0) || Garland (2–1) || || 21,724 || 13–7
|- align="center" bgcolor="bbffbb"
| 21 || April 24 || Braves || 6–5 (12) || Belisle (1–1) || Ayala (1–1) || || 35,234 || 14–7
|- align="center" bgcolor="ffbbbb"
| 22 || April 25 || @ Diamondbacks || 3–2 || Cahill (1–3) || de la Rosa (2–2) || Putz (4) || 24,532 || 14–8
|- align="center" bgcolor="bbffbb"
| 23 || April 26 || @ Diamondbacks || 6–3 || Nicasio (3–0) || McCarthy (0–3) || Betancourt (8) || 28,801 || 15–8
|- align="center" bgcolor="ffbbbb"
| 24 || April 27 || @ Diamondbacks || 3–2 (10) || Putz (2–0) || Escalona (1–1) || || 31,019 || 15–9
|- align="center" bgcolor="ffbbbb"
| 25 || April 28 || @ Diamondbacks || 4–2 || Corbin (3–0) || Garland (2–2) || Putz (5) || 24,852 || 15–10
|- align="center" bgcolor="bbffbb"
| 26 || April 29 || @ Dodgers || 12–2 || Chatwood (1–0) || Lilly (0–1) || || 31,570 || 16–10
|- align="center" bgcolor="ffbbbb"
| 27 || April 30 || @ Dodgers || 6–2 || Ryu (3–1) || de la Rosa (2–3) || || 47,602 || 16–11
|-

|-  bgcolor="ffbbbb"
|- align="center" bgcolor="bbffbb"
| 28 || May 1 || @ Dodgers || 7–3 || Outman (1–0) || Beckett (0–4) || || 32,848 || 17–11
|- align="center" bgcolor="ffbbbb"
| 29 || May 3 || Rays || 7–4 (10) || Farnsworth (1–0) || Belisle (1–2) || Rodney (4) || 30,255 || 17–12
|- align="center" bgcolor="bbffbb"
| 30 || May 4|| Rays || 9–3 || Garland (3–2) || Price (1–3) || || 29,099 || 18–12
|- align="center" bgcolor="ffbbbb"
| 31 || May 5 || Rays || 8–3 ||  Cobb (4–2) || Chacín (3–1) || || 39,220 || 18–13
|- align="center" bgcolor="bbffbb"
| 32 || May 7 || Yankees || 2–0 || de la Rosa (3–3) || Kuroda (4–2) || Betancourt (9) || 41,595 || 19–13
|- align="center" bgcolor="ffbbbb"
| 33 || May 8 || Yankees || 3–2 || Robertson (2–0) || Betancourt (1–1) || Rivera (12) || 40,148 || 19–14
|- align="center" bgcolor="ffbbbb"
| 34 || May 9 || Yankees || 3–1 || Warren (1–0) || Francis (1–3) || Rivera (13) || 40,972 || 19–15
|- align="center" bgcolor="ffbbbb"
| 35 || May 10 || @ Cardinals || 3–0 || Miller (5–2) || Garland (3–3) || || 37,800 || 19–16
|- align="center" bgcolor="ffbbbb"
| 36 || May 11 || @ Cardinals || 3–0 || Wainwright (5–2) || Chacín (3–2) || || 43,050 || 19–17
|- align="center" bgcolor="bbffbb"
| 37 || May 12 || @ Cardinals || 8–2 || de la Rosa (4–3) || García (4–2) || || 40,881 || 20–17
|- align="center" bgcolor="ffbbbb"
| 38 || May 13 || @ Cubs || 9–1 || Wood (4–2) || Nicasio (3–1) || || 35,080 || 20–18
|- align="center" bgcolor="bbffbb"
| 39 || May 14 || @ Cubs || 9–4 || Francis (2–3) || Villanueva (1–3) || || 38,123 || 21–18
|- align="center" bgcolor="ffbbbb"
| 40 || May 15 || @ Cubs || 6–3 || Samardzija (2–5) || Garland (3–4) || || 38,083 || 21–19
|- align="center" bgcolor="ffbbbb"
| 41 || May 16 || Giants || 8–6 || Cain (3–2) || Chacín (3–3) || Romo (13) || 33,128 || 21–20
|- align="center" bgcolor="bbffbb"
| 42 || May 17 || Giants || 10–9 || de la Rosa (5–3) || Bumgarner (4–2) || Betancourt (10) || 43,365 || 22–20
|- align="center" bgcolor="bbffbb"
| 43 || May 18 || Giants || 10–2 || Chatwood (2–0) || Lincecum (3–3) || || 41,412 || 23–20
|- align="center" bgcolor="bbffbb"
| 44 || May 19 || Giants || 5–0 || Nicasio (4–1) || Zito (3–3) || || 47,494 || 24–20
|- align="center" bgcolor="ffbbbb"
| 45 || May 20 || Diamondbacks || 5–1 || Corbin (7–0) || Garland (3–5) || || 23,053 || 24–21
|- align="center" bgcolor="bbffbb"
| 46 || May 21 || Diamondbacks || 5–4 (10) || López (1–1)|| Reynolds (0–2) || || 27,096 || 25–21
|- align="center" bgcolor="bbffbb"
| 47 || May 22 || Diamondbacks || 4–1 || de la Rosa (6–3) || Cahill (3–5) || Brothers (1) || 31,763 || 26–21
|- align="center" bgcolor="bbffbb"
| 48 || May 24 || @ Giants || 5–0 || Chatwood (3–0) || Lincecum (3–4) || || 41,881 || 27–21
|- align="center" bgcolor="ffbbbb"
| 49 || May 25 || @ Giants || 6–5 (10) || Romo (3–2) || Betancourt (1–2) || || 41,784 || 27–22
|- align="center" bgcolor="ffbbbb"
| 50 || May 26 || @ Giants || 7–3 || Cain (4–2) || Garland (3–6) || || 42,597 || 27–23
|- align="center" bgcolor="ffbbbb"
| 51 || May 27 || @ Astros || 3–2 (12) || Clemens (2–2) || López (1–2) || || 16,044 || 27–24
|- align="center" bgcolor="bbffbb"
| 52 || May 28 || @ Astros || 2–1 || Belisle (2–2)|| Veras (0–4) || Betancourt (11) || 11,974 || 28–24
|- align="center" bgcolor="ffbbbb"
| 53 || May 29 || Astros || 6–3 || Clemens (3–2) || Escalona (1–2) || || 26,881 || 28–25
|- align="center" bgcolor="ffbbbb"
| 54 || May 30 || Astros || 7–5 || Harrell (4–6) || Nicasio (4–2) || Ambriz (1) || 26,239 || 28–26
|- align="center" bgcolor="ffbbbb"
| 55 || May 31 || Dodgers || 7–5 (10) || League (1–2) || Betancourt (1–3) || Belisario (1) || 37,923 || 28–27
|-

|-  bgcolor="ffbbbb"
|- align="center" bgcolor="bbffbb"
| 56 || June 1 || Dodgers || 7–6 (10) || Belisle (3–2) || Guerrier (1–2) || || 36,703 || 29–27
|- align="center" bgcolor="bbffbb"
| 57 || June 2 || Dodgers || 7–2 || de la Rosa (7–3) || Magill (0–1) || || 41,536 || 30–27
|- align="center" bgcolor="ffbbbb"
| 58 || June 3 || @ Reds || 3–0 || Arroyo (6–5) || Chatwood (3–1) || Chapman (15) || 18,498 || 30–28
|- align="center" bgcolor="bbffbb"
| 59 || June 4 || @ Reds || 5–4 || Outman (2–0) || LeCure (1–1) || Brothers (2) || 27,031 || 31–28
|- align="center" bgcolor="bbffbb"
| 60 || June 5 || @ Reds || 12–4 || Garland (4–6) || Villarreal (0–1) || || 26,665 || 32–28
|- align="center" bgcolor="ffbbbb"
| 61 || June 6 || Padres || 6–5 (12) || Gregerson (4–2) || Corpas (0–1) || Boxberger (1) || 29,840 || 32–29
|- align="center" bgcolor="bbffbb"
| 62 || June 7 || Padres || 10–9 || Belisle (4–2) || Thatcher (2–1) || || 30,477 || 33–29
|- align="center" bgcolor="ffbbbb"
| 63 || June 8 || Padres || 4–2 || Stults (5–5) || Francis (2–4) || Gregerson (2) || 34,590 || 33–30
|- align="center" bgcolor="bbffbb"
| 64 || June 9 || Padres || 8–7 (10) || Brothers (2–0) || Ross (0–3) || || 33,668 || 34–30
|- align="center" bgcolor="bbffbb"
| 65 || June 11 || Nationals || 8–3 || Chacín (4–3) || Haren (4–8) || || 33,736 || 35–30
|- align="center" bgcolor="ffbbbb"
| 66 || June 12 || Nationals || 5–1 || Ohlendorf (1–0) || de la Rosa (7–4) || || 30,304 || 35–31
|- align="center" bgcolor="ffbbbb"
| 67 || June 13 || Nationals || 5–4 || Stammen (4–2) || Belisle (4–3) || Soriano (17) || 37,017 || 35–32
|- align="center" bgcolor="ffbbbb"
| 68 || June 14 || Phillies || 8–7 || Stutes (2–0) || López (1–3) || Papelbon (13) || 36,114 || 35–33
|- align="center" bgcolor="bbffbb"
| 69 || June 15 || Phillies || 10–5 || Chatwood (4–1) || Pettibone (3–3) || || 35,516 || 36–33
|- align="center" bgcolor="bbffbb"
| 70 || June 16 || Phillies || 5–2 || Chacín (5–3) || Hamels (2–10) || Brothers (3) || 45,186 || 37–33
|- align="center" bgcolor="ffbbbb"
| 71 || June 17 || @ Blue Jays || 2–0 || Cecil (3–0) || Belisle (4–4) || Janssen (15) || 20,946 || 37–34
|- align="center" bgcolor="ffbbbb"
| 72 || June 18 || @ Blue Jays || 8–3 || Rogers (3–2) || Francis (2–5) || || 22,852 || 37–35
|- align="center" bgcolor="ffbbbb"
| 73 || June 19 || @ Blue Jays || 5–2 || Buehrle (4–4) || Nicasio (4–3) || Janssen (16) || 27,235 || 37–36
|- align="center" bgcolor="ffbbbb"
| 74 || June 20 || @ Nationals || 5–1 || Zimmermann (10–3) || Oswalt (0–1) || || 31,927 || 37–37
|- align="center" bgcolor="ffbbbb"
| 75 || June 21 || @ Nationals || 2–1 || Strasburg (4–6) || Corpas (0–2) || Soriano (19) || 34,917 || 37–38
|- align="center" bgcolor="bbffbb"
| 76 || June 22 || @ Nationals || 7–1 || Chacín (6–3) || Haren (4–9) || || 35,787 || 38–38
|- align="center" bgcolor="bbffbb"
| 77 || June 23 || @ Nationals || 7–6 || de la Rosa (8–4) || Detwiler (2–6) || Brothers (4) || 39,307 || 39–38
|- align="center" bgcolor="ffbbbb"
| 78 || June 25 || @ Red Sox || 11–4 || Dempster (5–8) || Nicasio (4–4) || || 36,286 || 39–39
|- align="center" bgcolor="ffbbbb"
| 79 || June 26 || @ Red Sox || 5–3 || Lackey (5–5) || Oswalt (0–2) || Uehara (2) || 34,632 || 39–40
|- align="center" bgcolor="ffbbbb"
| 80 || June 27 || Mets || 3–2 || Hawkins (3–1) || Belisle (4–5) || Parnell (14) || 34,387 || 39–41
|- align="center" bgcolor="bbffbb"
| 81 || June 28 || Giants || 4–1 || Chacín (7–3) || Zito (4–6) || || 38,428 || 40–41
|- align="center" bgcolor="bbffbb"
| 82 || June 29 || Giants || 2–1 || Betancourt (2–3) || Affeldt (1–4) || || 44,612 || 41–41
|- align="center" bgcolor="ffbbbb"
| 83 || June 30 || Giants || 5–2 || Bumgarner (8–5) || Pomeranz (0–1) || Romo (19) || 41,845 || 41–42
|-

|-  bgcolor="ffbbbb"
|- align="center" bgcolor="ffbbbb"
| 84 || July 2 || Dodgers || 8–0 || Kershaw (7–5) || Oswalt (0–3) || || 37,419 || 41–43
|- align="center" bgcolor="ffbbbb"
| 85 || July 3 || Dodgers || 10–8 || Greinke (6–2) || Chatwood (4–2) || Jansen (8) || 48,628 || 41–44
|- align="center" bgcolor="bbffbb"
| 86 || July 4 || Dodgers || 9–5 || Chacín (8–3) || Capuano (2–6) || || 48,794 || 42–44
|- align="center" bgcolor="ffbbbb"
| 87 || July 5 || @ Diamondbacks || 5–0 || Skaggs (2–1) || de la Rosa (8–5) || || 45,505 || 42–45
|- align="center" bgcolor="ffbbbb"
| 88 || July 6 || @ Diamondbacks || 11–1 || Miley (5–7) || Pomeranz (0–2) || || 22,395 || 42–46
|- align="center" bgcolor="ffbbbb"
| 89 || July 7 || @ Diamondbacks || 6–1 || Corbin (10–1) || Oswalt (0–4) || || 22,090 || 42–47
|- align="center" bgcolor="bbffbb"
| 90 || July 8 || @ Padres || 4–2 || Chatwood (5–2) || Vólquez (6–7) || Betancourt (12) || 20,400 || 43–47
|- align="center" bgcolor="ffbbbb"
| 91 || July 9 || @ Padres || 2–1 || Stults (7–7) || Chacín (8–4) || || 22,733 || 43–48
|- align="center" bgcolor="bbffbb"
| 92 || July 10 || @ Padres || 5–4 || de la Rosa (9–5) || Cashner (5–5) || Betancourt (13) || 19,411 || 44–48
|- align="center" bgcolor="ffbbbb"
| 93 || July 11 || @ Dodgers || 6–1 || Capuano (3–6) || Pomeranz (0–3) || || 52,740 || 44–49
|- align="center" bgcolor="bbffbb"
| 94 || July 12 || @ Dodgers || 3–0 || Nicasio (5–4) || Kershaw (8–6) || Betancourt (14) || 50,796 || 45–49
|- align="center" bgcolor="ffbbbb"
| 95 || July 13 || @ Dodgers || 1–0 || Greinke (8–2) || Chatwood (5–3) || || 51,992 || 45–50
|- align="center" bgcolor="bbffbb"
| 96 || July 14 || @ Dodgers || 3–1 || Chacín (9–4) || Nolasco (6–9) || Betancourt (15) || 51,402 || 46–50
|- align="center" bgcolor="ffbbbb"
| 97 || July 19 || Cubs || 3–1 || Samardzija (6–9) || Escalona (1–3) || Gregg (18) || 43,976 || 46–51
|- align="center" bgcolor="bbffbb"
| 98 || July 20 || Cubs || 9–3 || Nicasio (6–4) || Villanueva (2–6) || || 45,616 || 47–51
|- align="center" bgcolor="bbffbb"
| 99 || July 21 || Cubs || 4–3 || Chatwood (6–3) || Jackson (6–11) || Brothers (5) || 43,108 || 48–51
|- align="center" bgcolor="ffbbbb"
| 100 || July 22 || Marlins || 3–1 || Koehler (2–5) || Pomeranz (0–4) || Cishek (18) || 31,913 || 48–52
|- align="center" bgcolor="ffbbbb"
| 101 || July 23 || Marlins || 4–2 || Fernández (6–5) || Chacín (9–5) || Cishek (19) || 34,223 || 48–53
|- align="center" bgcolor="bbffbb"
| 102 || July 24 || Marlins || 2–1 || de la Rosa (10–5) || Turner (3–3) || Brothers (6) || 30,900 || 49–53
|- align="center" bgcolor="ffbbbb"
| 103 || July 25 || Marlins || 5–3 || Jennings (1–1) || Ottavino (0–2) || Cishek (20) || 33,165 || 49–54
|- align="center" bgcolor="bbffbb"
| 104 || July 26 || Brewers || 8–3 || Chatwood (7–3) || Peralta (7–10) || || 32,740 || 50–54
|- align="center" bgcolor="ffbbbb"
| 105 || July 27 || Brewers || 7–5 || Gorzelanny (2–4) || McHugh (0–2) || Henderson (12) || 38,012 || 50–55
|- align="center" bgcolor="bbffbb"
| 106 || July 28 || Brewers || 6–5 || Belisle (5–5) || Axford (4–4) || Brothers (7) || 33,237 || 51–55
|- align="center" bgcolor="ffbbbb"
| 107 || July 29 || @ Braves || 9–8 (10) || Downs (3–3) || Escalona (1–4) || || 31,218 || 51–56
|- align="center" bgcolor="ffbbbb"
| 108 || July 30 || @ Braves || 11–3 || Wood (1–2) || Nicasio (6–5) || || 28,107 || 51–57
|- align="center" bgcolor="ffbbbb"
| 109 || July 31 || @ Braves || 9–0 || Minor (11–5) || Chatwood (7–4) || || 22,097 || 51–58
|-

|-  bgcolor="ffbbbb"
|- align="center" bgcolor="ffbbbb"
| 110 || August 1 || @ Braves || 11–2 || Teherán (8–5) || Bettis (0–1) || || 30,069 || 51–59
|- align="center" bgcolor="bbffbb"
| 111 || August 2 || @ Pirates || 4–2 || Chacín (10–5) || Cole (5–5) || Brothers (8) || 37,487 || 52–59
|- align="center" bgcolor="ffbbbb"
| 112 || August 3 || @ Pirates || 5–2 || Liriano (12–4) || de la Rosa (10–6) || Melancon (6) || 38,424 || 52–60
|- align="center" bgcolor="ffbbbb"
| 113 || August 4 || @ Pirates || 5–1 || Burnett (5–7) || Nicasio (6–6) || || 37,980 || 52–61
|- align="center" bgcolor="ffbbbb"
| 114 || August 6 || @ Mets || 3–2|| Atchison (2–0) || López (1–4)|| Hawkins (1)|| 27,198 ||52–62
|- align="center" bgcolor="ffbbbb"
| 115 || August 7 || @ Mets || 5–0 || Harvey (9–3) || Chacín (10–6) || || 27,581 || 52–63
|- align="center" bgcolor="ffbbbb"
| 116 || August 8 || @ Mets || 2–1 || Gee (8–8) || Manship (0–1) || Hawkins (2) || 26,618 || 52–64
|- align="center" bgcolor="bbffbb"
| 117 || August 9 || Pirates || 10–1 || de la Rosa (11–6) || Liriano (12–5) || || 37,444 || 53–64
|- align="center" bgcolor="bbffbb"
| 118 || August 10 || Pirates || 6–4 || López (2–4) || Burnett (5–8) || Brothers (9) || 40,728 || 54–64
|- align="center" bgcolor="bbffbb"
| 119 || August 11 || Pirates || 3–2 || Corpas (1–2) || Morris (5–5) || Brothers (10) || 44,657 || 55–64
|- align="center" bgcolor="bbffbb"
| 120 || August 12 || Padres || 14–2 || Chacín (11–6) || Vólquez (8–10) || || 30,986 || 56–64
|- align="center" bgcolor="ffbbbb"
| 121 || August 13 || Padres || 7–5 || Stauffer (2–1) || Manship (0–2) || Street (23) || 30,366 || 56–65
|- align="center" bgcolor="bbffbb"
| 122 || August 14 || Padres || 4–2 || de la Rosa (12–6) || Cashner (8–7) || Brothers (11) || 30,099 || 57–65
|- align="center" bgcolor="bbffbb"
| 123 || August 16 || @ Orioles || 6–3 || Nicasio (7–6) || Chen (6–6) || || 31,438 || 58–65
|- align="center" bgcolor="ffbbbb"
| 124 || August 17 || @ Orioles || 8–4 || Norris (9–10) || Bettis (0–2) || || 31,089 || 58–66
|- align="center" bgcolor="ffbbbb"
| 125 || August 18 || @ Orioles || 7–2 || Feldman (10–9) || Chacín (11–7) || || 22,238 || 58–67
|- align="center" bgcolor="ffbbbb"
| 126 || August 19 || @ Phillies || 5–4 || Martin (2–2) || Manship (0–3) || Papelbon (21) || 35,269 || 58–68
|- align="center" bgcolor="bbffbb"
| 127 || August 20 || @ Phillies || 5–3 || de la Rosa (13–6) || Cloyd (2–3) || Betancourt (16) || 34,018 || 59–68
|- align="center" bgcolor="ffbbbb"
| 128 || August 21 || @ Phillies || 4–3 || Diekman (1–3) || Betancourt (2–4) || || 36,578 || 59–69
|- align="center" bgcolor="ffbbbb"
| 129 || August 22 || @ Phillies || 5–4 || Jiménez (1–0) || Betancourt (2–5) || || 31,619 || 59–70
|- align="center" bgcolor="bbffbb"
| 130 || August 23 || @ Marlins || 3–2 || Chacín (12–7) || Qualls (4–2) || Brothers (12) || 19,253 || 60–70
|- align="center" bgcolor="ffbbbb"
| 131 || August 24 || @ Marlins || 3–0 || Fernández (10–5) || Manship (0–4) || Cishek (28) || 23,333 || 60–71
|- align="center" bgcolor="bbffbb"
| 132 || August 25 || @ Marlins || 4–3 || de la Rosa (14–6) || Turner (3–5) || Brothers (13) || 20,191 || 61–71
|- align="center" bgcolor="bbffbb"
| 133 || August 26 || Giants || 6–1 || Nicasio (8–6) || Zito (4–10) || || 30,364 || 62–71
|- align="center" bgcolor="ffbbbb"
| 134 || August 27 || Giants || 5–3 || Petit (1–0) || Bettis (0–3) || Romo (32) || 26,601 || 62–72
|- align="center" bgcolor="bbffbb"
| 135 || August 28 || Giants || 5–4 || Chacín (13–7) || Bumgarner (11–9) || Brothers (14) || 27,268 || 63–72
|- align="center" bgcolor="bbffbb"
| 136 || August 30 || Reds || 9–6 || de la Rosa (15–6) || Arroyo (13–10) || || 29,415 || 64–72
|- align="center" bgcolor="ffbbbb"
| 137 || August 31 || Reds || 8–3 || Reynolds (1–2) || Nicasio (8–7) || || 37,616 || 64–73
|-

|-  bgcolor="ffbbbb"
|- align="center" bgcolor="bbffbb"
| 138 || September 1 || Reds || 7–4 || Ottavino (1–2) || Leake (11–6) || || 30,594 || 65–73
|- align="center" bgcolor="ffbbbb"
| 139 || September 2 || Dodgers || 10–8 || Kershaw (14–8) || Manship (0–5) || Jansen (25) || 36,822 || 65–74
|- align="center" bgcolor="ffbbbb"
| 140 || September 3 || Dodgers || 7–4 || Nolasco (12–9) || Chacín (13–8) || Withrow (1) || 25,807 || 65–75
|- align="center" bgcolor="bbffbb"
| 141 || September 4 || Dodgers || 7–5 || de la Rosa (16–6) || Vólquez (9–11) || Brothers (15) || 28,439 || 66–75
|- align="center" bgcolor="ffbbbb"
| 142 || September 6 || @ Padres || 4–3 || Street (2–4) || Brothers (2–1) || || 21,476 || 66–76
|- align="center" bgcolor="ffbbbb"
| 143 || September 7 || @ Padres || 2–1 || Gregerson (6–7) || Belisle (5–6) || Street (28) || 25,272 || 66–77
|- align="center" bgcolor="ffbbbb"
| 144 || September 8 || @ Padres || 5–2 || Vincent (4–2) || Oswalt (0–5) || Street (29) || 18,656 || 66–78
|- align="center" bgcolor="ffbbbb"
| 145 || September 9 || @ Giants || 3–2 (10) || Casilla (6–2) || Ottavino (1–3) || || 41,078 || 66–79
|- align="center" bgcolor="bbffbb"
| 146 || September 10 || @ Giants || 9–8 || López (3–4) || Romo (4–7) || Brothers (16) || 41,171 || 67–79
|- align="center" bgcolor="ffbbbb"
| 147 || September 11 || @ Giants || 4–3 || Moscoso (2–2) || Belisle (5–7) || Casilla (2) || 41,128 || 67–80
|- align="center" bgcolor="bbffbb"
| 148 || September 13 || @ Diamondbacks || 7–5 || Outman (3–0) || Harris (3–1) || Brothers (17) || 31,713 || 68–80
|- align="center" bgcolor="ffbbbb"
| 149 || September 14 || @ Diamondbacks || 9–2 || Miley (10–10) || Oswalt (0–6) || || 32,237 || 68–81
|- align="center" bgcolor="ffbbbb"
| 150 || September 15 || @ Diamondbacks || 8–2 || Delgado (5–6) || Chacín (13–9) || || 26,845 || 68–82
|- align="center" bgcolor="bbffbb"
| 151 || September 16 || Cardinals || 6–2 || Bettis (1–3) || Rosenthal (2–4) || || 31,117 || 69–82
|- align="center" bgcolor="ffbbbb"
| 152 || September 17 || Cardinals || 11–4 || Kelly (9–4) || Nicasio (8–8) || || 27,107 || 69–83
|- align="center" bgcolor="ffbbbb"
| 153 || September 18 || Cardinals || 4–3 || Wainwright (17–9) || Chatwood (7–5) || Mujica (37) || 26,955 || 69–84
|- align="center" bgcolor="bbffbb"
| 154 || September 19 || Cardinals || 7–6 (15) || Scahill (1–0) || Salas (0–3) || || 33,258 || 70–84
|- align="center" bgcolor="bbffbb"
| 155 || September 20 || Diamondbacks || 9–4 || Chacín (14–9) || Sipp (3–2) || || 38,247 || 71–84
|- align="center" bgcolor="ffbbbb"
| 156 || September 21 || Diamondbacks || 7–2 || Cahill (8–10) || McHugh (0–3) || || 36,005 || 71–85
|- align="center" bgcolor="ffbbbb"
| 157 || September 22 || Diamondbacks || 13–9 || Harris (4–1) || Nicasio (8–9) || || 43,736 || 71–86
|- align="center" bgcolor="bbffbb"
| 158 || September 24 || Red Sox || 8–3 || Chatwood (8–5) || Lackey (10–13) || || 32,315 || 72–86
|- align="center" bgcolor="ffbbbb"
| 159 || September 25 || Red Sox || 15–5 || Peavy (12–5) || Chacín (14–10) || || 48,775 || 72–87
|- align="center" bgcolor="ffbbbb"
| 160 || September 27 || @ Dodgers || 11–0 || Kershaw (16–9) || McHugh (0–4) || || 52,367 || 72–88
|- align="center" bgcolor="bbffbb"
| 161 || September 28 || @ Dodgers || 1–0 || Nicasio (9–9) || Greinke (15–4) || Brothers (18) || 52,879 || 73–88
|- align="center" bgcolor="bbffbb"
| 162 || September 29 || @ Dodgers || 2–1 || Francis (3–5) || Ryu (14–8) || Brothers (19) || 52,396 || 74–88
|-

Player stats

Batting

Starters by position 
Note: Pos = Position; G = Games played; AB = At bats; H = Hits; Avg. = Batting average; HR = Home runs; RBI = Runs batted in

Other batters 
Note: G = Games played; AB = At bats; H = Hits; Avg. = Batting average; HR = Home runs; RBI = Runs batted in

Pitching

Starting pitchers 
Note: G = Games pitched; IP = Innings pitched; W = Wins; L = Losses; ERA = Earned run average; SO = Strikeouts

Other pitchers 
Note: G = Games pitched; IP = Innings pitched; W = Wins; L = Losses; ERA = Earned run average; SO = Strikeouts

Relief pitchers 
Note: G = Games pitched; W = Wins; L = Losses; SV = Saves; ERA = Earned run average; SO = Strikeouts

Farm system

References

2013 Colorado Rockies season at Baseball Reference
2013 Colorado Rockies season Official Site 

Colorado Rockies seasons
Colorado Rockies
Colorado Rockies
2010s in Denver